Keep Pushin' may refer to the title of a song.

As a single
 "Keep Pushin'" by Boris Dlugosch

From an album
 "Keep Pushin'" from R.E.O. (album)
 "Keep Pushin'" from Pebble to a Pearl
 "Keep Pushin'" from Silverback Gorilla